Samuel Cassidy may refer to:

 Samuel H. Cassidy, attorney and lieutenant governor of Colorado
 Samuel James Cassidy (1963–2021), perpetrator of the 2021 San Jose shooting